Mora Municipality (Mora kommun) is a municipality in Dalarna County in central Sweden. Its seat is located in the town of Mora.

The present municipality was created in 1971, when four older municipal entities were amalgamated.

Localities 
Bergkarlås
Bonäs
Färnäs
Gesunda
Gopshus
Mora (seat)
Nusnäs
Selja
Sollerön
Vattnäs
Venjan
Vinäs
Våmhus
Östnor
Öna

Riksdag elections

See also
Zorn Collections
Mora, Minnesota
Mora County, New Mexico
Mora clock
Mora knife

References

External links

Municipalities of Dalarna County